K38 may refer to:
 K-38 (Kansas highway)
 Apollo et Hyacinthus, an opera by Wolfgang Amadeus Mozart
 , a corvette of the Royal Navy
 , a Hunt-class destroyer of the Israeli Navy
 K-38 trailer, an American military trailer
 K38 Water Safety, an American training organization
 Opel Kadett K38, a German automobile
 Potassium-38, an isotope of potassium
 Smith & Wesson Model 14, originally the K-38 Target Masterpiece
 Smith & Wesson Model 15, originally the K-38 Combat Masterpiece
 Washington County Memorial Airport, in Kansas